"Mind the Baby, Mr. Bean" is the tenth episode of the British television series Mr. Bean, produced by Tiger Television and Thames Television for Central Independent Television. It was originally scheduled for broadcast on 1 March 1993 on ITV, but following the murder of Kirkby toddler James Bulger on 12 February 1993, it was delayed for over a year until 25 April 1994.

Plot

Act 1: The Baby 
Mr. Bean decides to go to the Funfair at Southsea, Portsmouth. He has difficulty finding it, especially after some people at the beach give him contradictory directions, but is eventually successful in locating the fair. However, the boot handle of his Mini is not in its locked position, and as he reverses and moves forward again, a baby's pram gets caught in the handle, and tags along with him to the funfair. Once Bean notices the "kidnapped" baby, he initially attempts to leave it in a crowd of chatting mothers with babies, but they are oblivious to the baby's presence, and leave it behind. Being a responsible citizen, Bean reluctantly goes back for the baby. Bean, however, sees who he believes to be a policeman outside the amusement park entrance and races to find him, but loses him among a crowd of boys wearing fake police helmets from a nearby souvenir shop. Bean eventually realizes that he has no choice but to look after the baby whilst enjoying himself. Bean unchains a Doberman dog and uses the chain to tie the baby's pram on a moving ride while taking the baby with him on various rides. First, he goes to the dodgems, but in his hurry to pay the man in charge, he puts the baby's feet on the pedal and has trouble getting back to the dodgem by riding on the back of other dodgems and driving his own while standing up. The man in charge stops the dodgems and confronts Bean, who manages to hide the baby and sneak off.

Act 2: The Kiddie Ride 
Bean finds a Postman Pat kiddie ride and decides to put the baby inside to cheer him up; however, he then puts nine coins in it so it will play for a long time and keep the baby safe while Bean can go off and have fun on his own. Bean goes on a roller coaster, but he quickly gets bored and falls asleep. He then goes to an archery range but accidentally hits the employee on the head, before running off. He tries his hand with a coin pusher game in an amusement arcade and tries to cheat by repeatedly hitting the machine after running out of coins. He succeeds in releasing many coins from the machine, but gets his comeuppance when a young boy (who he tried to stop from having a turn earlier) steals his prize. Meanwhile, a long queue builds up by the kiddie ride. Bean, apparently oblivious to the queue, tries to put more coins in when an angry mother confronts him by complaining to him that they have been waiting for half an hour, forcing a disgruntled Bean to take the baby out.

Act 3: Changing the Nappy 
While walking the baby in his pram, Bean suddenly detects a bad smell and, after some pondering over the source of the smell, realizes that the baby needs its nappy changed. Unable to find any fresh nappies in the pram, Bean steals a teddy bear from a little girl after helping her onto a merry-go-round, cuts the stuffing out and uses it as a makeshift nappy for the baby, while carelessly leaving the real nappy on a ride, which starts and causes the nappy to be blown about the funfair and ending up on various people's faces and a man's toffee apple. The baby cries and Bean tries to calm him with his squeaky toy, while the Doberman he set free earlier on follows the noise (comically barking each time Bean squeaks the toy) and gets close to the baby. Though the dog means no harm towards either Bean or the baby, Bean lures the Doberman into a ticket booth and locks it inside. In order to cheer the baby up, Bean cheats in a game of darts by prematurely piercing cards with his darts and throwing them in such a way that it appears he hit a card with all three darts, winning a goldfish. But the plastic bag carrying the fish leaks, and when a nearby water tap proves to be not working, Bean desperately puts the fish and the remaining water in his mouth in order to keep it alive. With the fish still in his mouth, Bean then plays a round of Bingo. He presses the number 69 and wins, but upon shouting "Bingo!", he reflexively swallows the fish. Fortunately, he manages to spit the goldfish out of his mouth and into a fishbowl with another goldfish; Bean notices this and smiles before leaving.

Act 4: The Reunion 
Later on, the baby cries again, and this time, Bean has nothing to calm  him down. Bean buys lots of balloons and ties them to the pram, but, although it succeeds in making the baby stop crying, the balloons carry the pram into the sky. In panic after seeing this, Bean steals a bow and arrow from the archery game where he hit the employee, sharpens the tip of the wooden arrow with a pencil sharpener and fires it, popping some balloons and allowing the pram to land softly right in the same spot Bean accidentally took it from, where the baby's mother is reporting the disappearance to the police. The mother is reunited with the baby, much to Bean's happiness (though the mother shows confusion when she sees the baby's teddy bear nappy). As he watches the happy reunion, Bean realizes he forgot to return the squeaky toy, but decides to keep it as a reminder of his little friend. Bean starts to drive home, unaware that the Doberman, having escaped from the ticket booth, has sneaked into the back of his Mini. As he drives off, Bean squeaks the toy once more and the dog barks, scaring Bean.

Cast
Rowan Atkinson as Mr. Bean
Elliot Henderson-Boyle as the baby
Susie McKenna as the baby's mother
Andy Bradford as the bumper car's attendant
Nick Scott as the man in booth
Lydia Henderson-Boyle as the irritated mother
Anthony Hamblin as the coin pusher kid
Matthew Ashforde as the young man with candy apple
Robin Driscoll as the man buying ride tokens
Vanessa Cherié Guarnera as girl (unknown)
Zara McDowell as girl (unknown)

Production 
The entire episode was filmed on location at Clarence Pier, Southsea. This is one of only two episodes to be filmed entirely on location with one storyline and the last episode to be directed by Paul Weiland. The other episode-length story, Mr. Bean in Room 426, was also filmed in Southsea. This is also the last episode in the series to be shot on 35mm film.

A clip of the scene where Mr. Bean puts the balloons on the pram was shown in an episode of MythBusters, in which it was tested whether a large number of balloons could indeed lift a small child into the sky. It was proven to be plausible, although an impracticably large number of balloons were needed for it to actually work.

Casting
Matthew Ashforde who played the hotel porter in Mr. Bean in Room 426, returned as the young man with toffee apple.

Music
"Shakin' All Over", performed by Johnny Kidd & the Pirates, and "Tiger Feet", performed by Mud as well as the Postman Pat theme song (kiddie ride) are featured in the episode, making it the only episode to feature licensed music.

References

External links 
 

Mr. Bean episodes
1994 British television episodes
Television shows written by Rowan Atkinson
Television shows written by Robin Driscoll